Cham Hashem-e Dehqan (also Romanized as Cham Hāshem-e Dehqān; also known as Cham Hāshem-e Qal‘eh Dehqān and Dehqān) is a village in Soltanabad Rural District, in the Central District of Ramhormoz County, Khuzestan Province, Iran. At the 2006 census, its population was 137, in 28 families.

References 

Populated places in Ramhormoz County